The 2016 Los Angeles Rams season was the franchise's 79th season in the National Football League (NFL) and the fifth and final under head coach Jeff Fisher. It was the franchise's 50th season in the Greater Los Angeles Area and the first since 1994. The team returned to Los Angeles after 21 seasons in St. Louis. The Rams decided from 2016 to 2019 to return to wearing white uniforms at home in Los Angeles as a nod to the Fearsome Foursome era. In Week 15 against the Seattle Seahawks, their NFC West divisional rival, the Rams wore white horns on their helmet just for the one game only, a move which would be repeated for the entire following season.

The 2016 season saw the Rams attempting to improve upon their 7–9 record from 2015. After a surprising 3–1 start, the Rams would massively struggle in the second half, going 1–11 in their final 12 games, en route to a 4–12 record. The Rams also went 1–7 at home in 2016, their worst home record since going 0–8 at home in their 1–15 2009 season. The Rams also missed the playoffs for the 12th straight season. The franchise also clinched its tenth straight losing season. The Rams were also the only team to lose to the San Francisco 49ers in 2016, as both wins for the 49ers were against the Rams. 

On December 12, 2016, Fisher was fired after a 42–14 loss to the Atlanta Falcons that dropped the Rams to 4–9. John Fassel was named interim head coach and went winless over the final three games. This was the last season with the Rams having a losing record until 2022. It was the final time the Rams began a season with a loss until the same season.

Because the Oakland Raiders went 12–4, their first winning season in 14 years, the Rams were the only team from 2004 to this year that did not have a single winning season.

Return to Los Angeles
After receiving permission to void its lease on the Edward Jones Dome in St. Louis during the 2015 season, the team officially filed an application to relocate back to Los Angeles on January 4, 2016, where it would play at the SoFi Stadium in Inglewood when completed; construction began in December 2015, and the stadium opened in September 2020. In the interim, the Rams would play seven of their home games at the Los Angeles Memorial Coliseum, and the eighth game at Twickenham Stadium in London as part of the NFL International Series. The Rams also resumed holding training camp at UC Irvine, where they had previously held training camp during the 1990s prior to the move to St. Louis.

The Rams competed against the San Diego Chargers and Oakland Raiders, both of whom also filed relocation requests for a joint stadium in Carson for the rights to the Los Angeles market; the Chargers received a one-year option to decide if they wanted to share the Inglewood stadium with the Rams, which they did in the following season in 2017. Had the Chargers not accepted the option, a one-year option would have been granted to the Raiders after theirs expired. The Raiders would eventually move to Las Vegas, Nevada in 2020 to play at Allegiant Stadium. The league made their decision in a special meeting on January 12; after two ballots, the Rams' proposal was accepted on a 30–2 vote.

The Rams' return to the Greater Los Angeles Area received extensive media coverage. The team made its first appearance on HBO's Hard Knocks, which covered training camp and preseason. Several players and their families were followed on the new E! reality series Hollywood & Football as they settled in Southern California, while the regular season was later chronicled in the Amazon Prime sports documentary series All Or Nothing.

The Coliseum was previously the Rams' home for 34 seasons (1946–1979); they moved to Anaheim Stadium in Orange County in 1980, and played there for fifteen seasons before the move to St. Louis in 1995.

Draft

Notes
 The Rams acquired the No. 1 overall pick from the Tennessee Titans along with a 4th and 6th round selections in exchange for the Rams No. 15 overall pick, two-second-round picks, and a third-round pick in the 2016 draft. The Titans also received the Rams first and third-round picks in 2017.
 The Rams acquired an additional second-round selection as part of a trade that sent quarterback Sam Bradford to the Philadelphia Eagles. This selection along with their original second-round pick were traded for the number one overall selection of the 2016 draft.
 The Rams will forfeit their fifth-round selection after selecting offensive tackle Isaiah Battle in the 2015 Supplemental draft.
 The Rams traded their seventh-round selection to the Houston Texans in exchange for quarterback Case Keenum.

Staff

Final roster

Preseason

Regular season

Schedule
On November 25, 2015, the NFL announced that the Rams would play host to a then-undetermined NFC East opponent in the International Series, in the first-ever game at Twickenham Stadium in London, United Kingdom. On January 3, 2016, the New York Giants were confirmed as the Rams' opponent for this game, both teams having finished in third place in their respective divisions in the  season. The game was played in Week 7 on Sunday, October 23. The kickoff time was announced on April 14, and both teams had their bye the following week. As a condition of the Rams' use of the Coliseum, the University of Southern California requested that the NFL not schedule any Monday night home games at the stadium, nor any home games on days after USC football games. While the team's final schedule did not contain any home Monday night games, two games were played on days following an USC home game. The Rams wore their white uniforms for all of their home games for the first time since 1971 as a nod to the Fearsome Foursome era, with the exception of wearing their throwback uniforms twice a year for home games and wearing their all-navy uniforms for the game in London.

Note: Intra-division opponents are in bold text.

Game summaries

Week 1: at San Francisco 49ers

The now-Los Angeles Rams stumbled badly in their season opener, getting shut out by the host 49ers on Monday Night Football. Quarterback Case Keenum was ineffective, completing less than 50 percent of his passes (17-for-35) for 130 yards and two interceptions, while also being sacked twice. Running back Todd Gurley was also lackluster, with only 47 yards on 17 carries. Defensively, linebacker Alec Ogletree led the team with 12 tackles (11 solo) and defensive end Dominique Easley forced a fumble that was recovered by cornerback Trumaine Johnson. But the Rams came up with no sacks, and defensive tackle Aaron Donald was ejected from the game in the fourth quarter for unsportsmanlike conduct and making contact with a game official, an incident for which he later apologized.

Week 2: vs. Seattle Seahawks

Playing at home in the Los Angeles Memorial Coliseum for the first time since 1979, the Rams got the victory in a defensive battle over their NFC West rivals. Three field goals from kicker Greg Zuerlein were enough for the Rams, who played in front of a homecoming crowd of 91,046. With the win, the Rams won a regular season game in Los Angeles for the first time since 1994. Case Keenum completed 18 of 30 passes for 239 yards, and wide receiver Kenny Britt caught six passes for 94 yards. Robert Quinn and William Hayes both had sacks of Seahawks quarterback Russell Wilson, while Alec Ogletree had nine tackles and a fumble recovery on Seattle's final drive to preserve the victory. The Rams paid tribute to their first regular season game back in Los Angeles by wearing their blue and yellow throwback uniforms, which were their uniforms during their last season in 1994. This would also turn out to be the only game that the Rams won at home all season.

Week 3: at Tampa Bay Buccaneers

Held out of the end zone in the season's first two weeks, the Rams scored five touchdowns in what would be their highest single-game point total of the season. Case Keenum's 44-yard scoring strike to wide receiver Brian Quick ended L.A.'s TD drought, and Greg Zuerlein kicked a 53-yard field goal to give the Rams a 10-6 lead at the end of the first quarter. After the host Buccaneers scored twice to take a 20-10 lead, Todd Gurley scored on a pair of 1-yard touchdown runs in both the second and third quarters to put the Rams back in the lead. Defensive end Ethan Westbrooks picked up a fumble forced by Robert Quinn and ran it back 77 yards for a touchdown, and Keenum connected with Tavon Austin for a 43-yard touchdown pass play and a 37-26 lead. But Tampa Bay rallied behind quarterback Jameis Winston (405 yards, 3 TD passes) to pull within five points. Driving in the final minute, the Bucs reached the Rams 5-yard line, but Quinn brought down Winston from behind as time expired. With two minutes remaining in the fourth quarter, game play was suspended for 69 minutes due to lightning strikes in the area. With the win, the Rams record improved to 2–1 for the first time since 2006, placing the team in first place in the NFC West. It was also the first time the Rams scored a regular season touchdown as the Los Angeles Rams since 1994. This was the only game all season that the Rams scored at least 30 points.

Week 4: at Arizona Cardinals

Case Keenum connected twice for touchdown passes to Brian Quick as Los Angeles held on for the victory, which gave the Rams a 3–1 start for the first time since 2006. Linebacker Mark Barron had a team-high eight tackles and an interception as the Rams defense forced five turnovers. Defensive tackle Aaron Donald was named NFC Defensive Player of the Week after recording five tackles with 1.5 sacks on the day as the Rams found themselves in first place in the NFC West.

Week 5: vs. Buffalo Bills

Greg Zuerlein kicked four field goals, but the Rams were undone by numerous mistakes in a home loss to the Bills. Case Keenum passed for 271 yards, but was intercepted twice and sacked four times. Kenny Britt's five receptions for 75 yards led the Rams, while Todd Gurley ran for 72 yards and a touchdown, but also lost a fumble at the end of the first quarter that led to a Buffalo touchdown. Bills cornerback Nickell Robey-Coleman, who scored on a 41-yard interception return, would join the Rams the following season.

Week 6: at Detroit Lions

Case Keenum passed for three touchdowns and ran for another, but an interception in the final minutes ruined a comeback attempt as the Rams fell to 3-3 with a loss to the host Lions. Keenum set a team record with 19 straight completions on 27-for-32 passing with 321 yards. Tied 14-14 with four seconds remaining in the first half, the Rams failed to take the lead as Todd Gurley (14 carries, 58 yards) was stopped short of the goal line as time ran out. Wide receiver Kenny Britt caught seven passes for 136 yards and two scores, all season highs. Safety Lamarcus Joyner had eight tackles to lead the Rams, while Aaron Donald had four tackles and a sack.

Week 7: vs. New York Giants
NFL International Series

After scoring 10 points on their first two drives, the Rams could not score again as they allowed 17 unanswered points in losing to the Giants in the first NFL International Series game hosted at London's Twickenham Stadium. Case Keenum passed for 291 yards and a touchdown, but also threw four interceptions in the game, the first of which was returned 44 yards for a touchdown by Giants safety Landon Collins, and the last coming with 50 seconds remaining in the game as Keenum tossed an errant pass that was picked off by New York cornerback Dominique Rodgers-Cromartie in the end zone. Tavon Austin had a career-high 10 receptions for 57 yards and a touchdown on offense. Linebacker Alec Ogletree and cornerback Troy Hill each had seven solo tackles to share the team lead for the defense, which got no sacks as the Rams dropped to a 3-4 record going into the bye week.

Week 9: vs. Carolina Panthers

Despite outgaining the visiting Panthers 339-244, the Rams continued to struggle in a defensive battle at the Coliseum. Linebacker Mark Barron had nine solo tackles and a sack as the Rams defense got to Carolina quarterback Cam Newton five times, with defensive tackle Aaron Donald collecting two sacks. Midway through the fourth quarter, Rams quarterback Case Keenum, who passed for 296 yards, drove his team to the Carolina 7-yard line, but his third down pass to tight end Lance Kendricks (team-high seven receptions, 90 yards) was dropped at the goal line, forcing the Rams to settle for a Greg Zuerlein field goal. In the final minutes, the Rams drove 75 yards in 15 plays when Keenum connected with wide receiver Kenny Britt for a 10-yard touchdown with 34 seconds remaining to close to within 13-10, but the Panthers recovered the onside kick and then ran out the clock.

Week 10: at New York Jets

Despite another ugly offensive performance, the Rams relied on special teams and defense to grab what would turn out to be their last victory of the season. It was the second time in the 2016 season that the Rams won without scoring a touchdown. Kicker Greg Zuerlein accounted for all of the Rams' scoring with field goals of 20, 38, and 34 yards in the first, third, and fourth quarters, respectively. Early in the fourth quarter with the score tied and the Rams facing 4th-and-1 from their own 17, All-Pro punter Johnny Hekker boomed a career-long 78-yard punt that pinned the Jets inside the 20. Hekker, who averaged 51.7 yards on seven punts, was named NFC Special Teams Player of the Week for his pivotal role in changing the Rams' fortunes on the day. The Rams defense then forced the Jets to punt to near midfield, which set up what would ultimately be Zuerlein's game-winning score. Linebacker Alec Ogletree, who had a team-high nine tackles, picked off a Bryce Petty pass at the two-minute warning to preserve the win, as the Rams improved to 4–5 without scoring a touchdown. Wide receiver Kenny Britt had seven catches for 109 yards for the Rams on offense.

Week 11: vs. Miami Dolphins

Rookie quarterback Jared Goff, the No. 1 overall pick in the 2016 NFL Draft, made his first start for the Rams. After going three-and-out on his first series, Goff completed his first two passes to tight end Tyler Higbee (2 yards) and wide receiver Kenny Britt (19 yards) to set up a 25-yard touchdown run by running back Todd Gurley. The Rams took a 10–0 lead late in the third quarter on a 46-yard field goal by Greg Zuerlein. But Zeurlein just missed on a 48-yard attempt midway through the fourth quarter, which gave the Dolphins an opportunity to come back. Despite being sacked four times, Miami quarterback Ryan Tannehill threw touchdown passes to Jarvis Landry and DeVante Parker, the last coming with just 36 seconds remaining in the game to take the 14–10 win. Linebackers Mark Barron and Alec Ogletree each had 11 tackles, while defensive end Dominique Easley had two sacks. On offense, Goff completed 17 of 31 passes for 134 yards and was sacked once in his career and season debut.

Week 12: at New Orleans Saints

Jared Goff threw for three touchdowns in the first half for the first scoring passes of his career, but it was not enough as Drew Brees passed for four touchdowns and ran for another as the host Saints shredded the Rams defense, which gave up a season-high 555 yards. Goff drove the Rams 75 yards in six plays on the opening drive, capping it off with a 24-yard touchdown strike to Tavon Austin. Following a strip sack of Brees by Aaron Donald with a fumble recovery by Mark Barron at the beginning of the second quarter, Goff opened up the second quarter with a 6-yard touchdown pass to Kenny Britt. New Orleans then scored 21 unanswered points before the Rams responded with Goff connecting with Lance Kendricks from 15 yards out with 55 seconds remaining in the period to bring Los Angeles to within 28-21. But the Rams would get no closer, as the Saints scored three more touchdowns in a dominating second half. Goff completed 20 of 32 passes for 214 yards with three touchdowns and one interception, but was sacked three times and lost a fumble. Barron had a team-high 14 tackles (10 solo) to go along with his fumble recovery.

Week 13: at New England Patriots

The Rams offered little resistance on the road against the eventual Super Bowl champions, which held visiting Los Angeles to just 162 yards in total offense. Jared Goff completed 14 of 32 passes for 161 yards, was intercepted twice and sacked four times. Much of that yardage came after the two-minute warning in the fourth quarter, when Goff connected with Kenny Britt for a 66-yard pass play. Two plays later, Goff and Britt connected again for a 1-yard touchdown. Alec Ogletree had 14 tackles to lead the Rams defense.

Week 14: vs. Atlanta Falcons

Returning home to the Coliseum, the Rams were in trouble from the start, when Mike Thomas muffed the opening kickoff, which was recovered by the Falcons at the Rams 3-yard line. One play later, Atlanta quarterback Matt Ryan threw the first of three touchdown passes on the day with a 3-yard strike to wide receiver Justin Hardy as Atlanta, the eventual NFC Champion, romped to victory even without playing its top two wideouts Julio Jones and Mohamed Sanu, who were both sidelined with injuries. Ryan tossed his second touchdown to running back Tevin Coleman at the start of the second quarter. Meanwhile, Rams rookie quarterback Jared Goff struggled greatly, throwing two interceptions in the first half, the second of which was returned 33 yards for a touchdown by linebacker Deion Jones and a 21-0 Falcons lead. On Atlanta's first possession of the third period, Ryan found wide receiver Taylor Gabriel for a 64-yard touchdown pass play and Coleman added another score on a 6-yard TD run. The Falcons rout was completed on the Rams' next drive as defensive end Vic Beasley, who had three sacks of Goff, stripped the Rams QB of the ball and scooped it up himself for a 21-yard fumble recovery return touchdown. The Rams salvaged some dignity in the fourth quarter with short touchdown runs by Goff and Todd Gurley, but the outcome of the game had long been decided. After the game, Gurley lashed out at the team for running a "middle-school offense." The loss (in which Los Angeles was mathematically eliminated from postseason contention) was the 165th of Jeff Fisher's career, tying him with Dan Reeves for the most in NFL history. The game would turn to be his last for Fisher as the Rams' head coach, as he was fired the following day. Fisher ended his professional coaching career with a record of 172-165-1.

Week 15: at Seattle Seahawks

Just three days after being named interim head coach, John Fassel led the Rams into their final road game of the season. The Rams offense continued to sputter under the direction of offensive coordinator Rob Boras, with only a Greg Zuerlein field goal late in the second quarter averting a shutout. Jared Goff completed 13 of 25 passes for 135 yards and was sacked four times. Early in the fourth quarter, Goff led the Rams on their best drive of the game, going from their own 20 in 12 plays before taking off on a 15-yard run down to the Seattle 2-yard line, where he was knocked out of bounds and out of the game on a hard hit by Seahawks cornerback Richard Sherman. Case Keenum relieved Goff at quarterback, but was ineffective and the Rams were held without a touchdown for the fourth time in the season. Linebacker Mark Barron and cornerback Mike Jordan both had seven tackles to lead the Rams defense. As this was an NFL Color Rush game, the Rams played in the all-white uniforms that constituted their primary uniform for the season, but with all-white socks. Additionally, Los Angeles switched to gray facemasks and went with white horns on their blue helmets for the first time since the 1972 NFL season.

Week 16: vs. San Francisco 49ers

In a matchup of two of the NFL's worst teams, Los Angeles started fast but faded in the fourth quarter as the 49ers, who had shut out the Rams in Week 1, snapped their own 13-game losing streak with a victory in the final minute. Todd Gurley and Tavon Austin both scored on touchdown runs in the first quarter to give the Rams a 14-7 lead. Both teams held each other scoreless in the second and third periods, but it seemed that the Rams would outlast their rivals in the fourth when quarterback Jared Goff connected with fellow rookie tight end Tyler Higbee for a 2-yard touchdown with 10:38 remaining to build a 21-7 lead. But the 49ers rallied behind quarterback Colin Kaepernick (28-38, 266 yards), who led his team on a 14-play, 75-yard drive that ended with Kaepernick running it in from 13 yards out. Then after the Rams were held to a three-and-out, Kaepernick drove San Francisco 75 yards in 10 plays, firing a 10-yard touchdown pass to wide receiver Rod Streater with 36 seconds remaining. The 49ers then opted to go for the win, and Kaepernick successfully scrambled into the end zone to put his team on top 22-21, as the 49ers swept the season series for the first time since 2013. Following the game, a solemn Goff took responsibility for the loss (which dropped the Rams to 4-11) and pledged during his postgame press conference, "I promise everyone out there, all of the Rams fans, that I’m going to do everything I can, everything in me, to make that happen and get this thing fixed."

Week 17: vs. Arizona Cardinals

The Rams' 2016 season came to an end on the first day of 2017 with yet another listless performance that capped off the franchise's 10th straight losing campaign. Kicker Greg Zuerlein provided the Rams' only scoring once again with field goals of 37 and 36 yards in the second quarter. Arizona quarterback Carson Palmer, who won the Heisman Trophy while playing at USC, had a successful day in his return to the Coliseum, passing for 255 yards and three touchdowns as the Cardinals scored 28 unanswered points in the second half. Offensively, quarterback Jared Goff completed 13 of 20 passes for 120 yards, but was sacked a season-high seven times. A year after winning NFL Offensive Rookie of the Year honors, Todd Gurley had 14 carries for 40 yards to finish the season with just 885 rushing yards despite playing in all 16 games. The Rams offense ended with a league-worst 224 points scored, and were held to 10 or fewer points for the ninth time in the season. Cornerback Blake Countess had nine tackles for the Rams, who finished their season at 4–12.

Standings

Division

Conference

Awards and honors

References

External links
 

Los Angeles
Los Angeles Rams seasons
2016 in Los Angeles
Los Angeles Rams